The Courthouse Square Historic District is a national historic district located at Farmington, St. Francois County, Missouri.  The district encompasses 26 contributing buildings in the central business district of Farmington. It developed between about 1871 and 1954, and includes representative examples of Greek Revival, Gothic Revival, Late Victorian, Beaux Arts, and Bungalow / American Craftsman style architecture.  Located in the district is the separately listed St. Francois County Jail and Sheriff's Residence. Other notable buildings include the St. Francois County Courthouse (c. 1926), Rottger Building (c. 1904), Gierse Tailor Shop (c. 1876), Long Memorial Hall (1924), Methodist Episcopal Church (c. 1904), Masonic Temple (c. 1911), and Fitz Building (c. 1937).

It was listed on the National Register of Historic Places in 2004.

References

Historic districts on the National Register of Historic Places in Missouri
Greek Revival architecture in Missouri
Gothic Revival architecture in Missouri
Victorian architecture in Missouri
Beaux-Arts architecture in Missouri
Bungalow architecture in Missouri
Buildings and structures in St. Francois County, Missouri
National Register of Historic Places in St. Francois County, Missouri